Jane Daly is an American actress. She is best known for Bob Clark's low-budget zombie movie Children Shouldn't Play with Dead Things and as the original Kelly Harper on the CBS soap opera Capitol.

Early life 
Daly was born in Philadelphia, Pennsylvania, the daughter of Edward A. Daly, a World War II Air Force Veteran. and Vice President of Standard Milling Co. and Lillian Mullen Daly, a former beauty queen and USO performer. 

She was raised in Valley Stream, New York and Miami, Florida, where she attended the University of Miami and graduated magna cum laude in theatre.

Career 
In 1963, at 15 years of age, Daly was crowned Miss Teenage Miami and a finalist in the Miss Teenage America Pageant in Dallas, Texas where she performed Peter Pan before a nationally televised audience. She and her mother became the face of Ivory Liquid  in the mother and daughter look-alike national commercial.

Another of her early film roles was in Bob Clark’s Deathdream with John Marley. Daly starred in the 1987 NBC series Roomies opposite Burt Young.  She is notable for her 1994 role in the Cable Ace Nominated And Then There Was One opposite Amy Madigan and Dennis Boutsikaris capturing the tragedy of the AIDS epidemic.  She played Julia's mother alongside Tom Cruise on Mission Impossible III.

Later work 
Daly has appeared in over 50 television movies and series roles. Her later work includes:

 Patrice Evers on The Rookie  (5 episodes, 2019–2022)
 Constance Horning on How to Get Away with Murder (2019)
 Sally on This Is Us (2018)

Personal life 
Daly is married to actor Duncan Gamble, whom she met while working on the soap opera Capitol.

Filmography 
 The Keeping Hours (2017), Elizabeth's Mother
 Mission: Impossible III (2006), Julia's Mother
 Amy (1981),  Molly Tribble
 The Black Marble (1980), Bullets' Girlfriend
 North Dallas Forty (1979), Ruth
 Dead of Night (1974),  Joanne
 Children Shouldn't Play with Dead Things (1972),  Terry
 Secrets of the Bermuda Triangle (1996),  Ginny Mae Cooper
 And Then There Was One (1994),  (TV Movie) – Lorrie
 Star (1993), Frances Hill
 Runaway Father (1991), Lorraine
 ...Where's Rodney? (1990), Ann Barnes
 Star Trek: The Next Generation (1990), Varria
 Highway to Heaven (1987), Lorraine Douglas 
 Did You Hear About Josh and Kelly? (1980), Kelly Porter

References

External links 

 

Living people
20th-century American actresses
21st-century American actresses
American film actresses
American television actresses
Actresses from Philadelphia
Actresses from Miami
People from Valley Stream, New York
Actresses from New York (state)
University of Miami alumni
Year of birth missing (living people)